2014 Turkish Super Cup (Turkish: TFF Süper Kupa) was the 41st edition of the Turkish Super Cup since its establishment as Presidential Cup in 1966. The match was contested between the 2013–14 Süper Lig champions Fenerbahçe and the 2013–14 Turkish Cup winners Galatasaray, making the game the 378th edition of Kıtalar Arası Derbi. The game was a rematch of the 2013 Turkish Super Cup, which was won by title holders Galatasaray.

Background
The fixture was the sixth overall national super cup matchup between the teams since 1966, and the third matchup since 2006 and 2013. Galatasaray last won the cup in 2013 against Fenerbahçe, while Fenerbahçe last won the cup in 2009 against Beşiktaş. In their previous finals, Galatasaray won in 1996, 2012 and 2013 editions, while Fenerbahçe in 1973 and 1985.

Path to the final
Fenerbahçe were champions in the regular season, finishing nine points ahead of Galatasaray. In the regular season, Fenerbahçe collected 74 points by 23 wins, 5 draws and 6 losses. They were trailed by Galatasaray, who collected 65 points by 18 wins, 11 draws and 5 losses.

Although runners-up of the league, Galatasaray performed better in the domestic cup. They entered the tournament at the fourth round. They won their fourth round match against Gaziantep Büyükşehir Belediyespor. In the fifth round, they beat Balıkesirspor. In the group stage, they were drawn against Antalyaspor, Elazığspor, and Tokatspor but were second position in the group. The semi-finals were the toughest home and away matches for Galatasaray, as they struggled against Bursaspor but were winners. In the 2014 Turkish Cup Final they were crowned champions against rivals Eskişehirspor by a decisive 1–0 win. This was a 15th win for Galatasaray since 1962, its first edition.

Match

Details

See also
 2013–14 Süper Lig
 2013–14 Turkish Cup

References

2014
Super Cup
Super Cup 2014
Super Cup 2014
Turkish Super Cup 2014